Smash! was a weekly British comic book, published initially by Odhams Press and subsequently by IPC Magazines, from 5 February 1966 to 3 April 1971. After 257 issues it merged into Valiant.

During 1967 and 1968 Smash! was part of Odhams' Power Comics line, notable for its publication of American superhero strips. During this period, alongside British humour strips, Smash! included black-and-white superhero reprints originally published in the US by Marvel Comics and DC Comics. In late 1968, Smash! absorbed its sister titles Pow! and Fantastic, thereby becoming the last surviving Power Comics title. In March 1969 Smash! underwent a major relaunch, and thereafter featured solely British content: a mixture of humour, sporting and adventure strips. A further relaunch in 1970 was almost as extensive, with a number of new strips introduced and an equal number cancelled.

Smash! was sized 9.75" x 12" (#1-162) and 9.25" x 12" (#163-257), and had a four-colour cover and black-and-white interior.

Publication history

Odhams 
Smash! was owned by the International Publishing Corporation (IPC), a company formed in 1963 – through a series of corporate mergers – by Cecil Harmsworth King, chairman of the Daily Mirror and the Sunday Pictorial (now the Sunday Mirror). All the comics owned by it were published by one or other of the subsidiary companies brought together to form IPC, including Fleetway Publications and Odhams Press.

Odhams' comics line was produced in London from 64 Long Acre, overseen by managing editor Alfred Wallace. Following the initial success of the anarchic humour comic Wham! in 1964, Smash! was launched (with a cover price of 7d for 24 pages) on 5 February 1966 following a similar model. Early on, Smash! successfully integrated superhero strips — Marvel Comics' the Hulk and DC Comics' Batman — into its lineup, prompting Wham! to do the same (with the Fantastic Four) shortly thereafter.

Odhams branded the two titles, and three more launched in quick succession — all heavily featuring Marvel reprints — as part of the Power Comics line, a gimmick dreamed up by Odhams to unify their five titles under a common banner (Smash! became a Power Comic with issue #44, published 3 December 1966). The Power Comics line was published under a three-man editorial team known as Alf, Bart, and Cos. "Alf" (Alfred Wallace) was the managing editor, and "Cos" (Albert Cosser) was the editor directly responsible for Smash!

Odhams comics titles faced their first serious crisis in May 1967. The editorial page warned readers in issue #68 (20 May 1967) that Smash!, initially printed by St. Clements Press Ltd of London, had to find new printers within one month, or face closure. As it turned out, Odhams were able to sign a contract with Southernprint Ltd of Poole in Dorset in time to maintain publication.

On 14 September 1968, with issue 137, the title merged with Pow! (which had previously absorbed Wham), becoming Smash! and Pow!. Later on 2 November, with issue 144, it merged with Fantastic (which had previously absorbed Terrific), becoming Smash and Pow incorporating Fantastic.

As a consequence of absorbing Pow! and then Fantastic, Smash! inherited some of their strips and characters:
 14 September 1968:  Merger with Pow! — inherited The Cloak, Wiz War, Fantastic Four (which had originated in Wham!), and Spider-Man. Also, Smash! later reprinted The Wacks, which originated in Wham!, as Nick and Nat – The Beat Boys.
 2 November 1968:  Merger with Fantastic — inherited The Mighty Thor.

Smash! featured the Power Comics logo on its cover for 100 issues, until #143 (26 October 1968); it was quietly dropped the week Smash! absorbed Fantastic to become the last surviving title in the line.

IPC Magazines 
On 1 January 1969 Odhams Press Ltd ceased operations and Smash! was thereafter published by IPC Magazines Ltd (an IPC subsidiary formed during 1968). The title was now published out of 189 High Holborn; later moving to Fleetway House on nearby Farringdon Road. Major changes of editorial policy occurred in 1969 for financial reasons: on 15 March of that year Smash! was relaunched without its American superhero strips. Further changes followed during the course of 1969, and then a second relaunch at the start of 1970, when IPC was taken over by Albert Edwin Reed to form the publishing giant Reed International.

The final issue of Smash! was published on 3 April 1971; soon after on 10 April it was merged with the IPC title Valiant, forming Valiant and Smash!.

Annuals and specials 
Ten Smash! Annuals were published in hardback, beginning with the 1967 Annual (published in 1966). These appeared every autumn. Even after the magazine's absorption by Valiant, the Smash! annual, published mainly under the Fleetway imprint, continued to appear every year. The final annual, cover-dated 1976, was published in the autumn of 1975.

There were also two 96-page Holiday Specials, published in 1969 and 1970, and a Valiant and Smash! Holiday Special in 1971.

Advertising 
A notable feature of the Odhams years was how few advertisements Smash! carried. There were occasional quarter-page inserts, mainly advertising foreign postage stamps for stamp collectors, or Subbuteo table-football, but they were few and far between, and their combined total didn't usually exceed one page per issue.

Reflecting its financial problems, the relaunched comic under IPC Magazines carried a significantly greater amount of advertising. One obvious change was the back cover (the only in-colour page apart from the front cover), which gradually began to carry colourful full-page advertisements. On the inside pages, too, there was a much more noticeable quantity of adverts: each issue typically carried four full-page ads, plus two half-page ads. It was a noticeable feature of the relaunch that the comic now expanded to 40 pages, in order to cope with the need to carry an extra four pages of advertising in each issue. This was a potentially significant new strategy and a major change of policy. No longer did the profitability of the comic rest exclusively with the income derived from its sales figures. That sales income was now supplemented by advertising revenue, and without even having to sacrifice any significant amount of page space, nor cancel any strips, thanks to adding the additional pages.

Background
In 1966 the initial success of Wham! (which had launched in 1964 and quickly built up strong circulation figures) encouraged Odhams' London management to publish a second title, conceived by Alf Wallace (Managing Editor of Odhams' juveniles – Eagle, Swift and Boys' World) and Albert Cosser. Leo Baxendale, who had created Wham! for Odhams in 1964, was too heavily embroiled with ongoing production on it, providing much of the art for each issue, so had little time for anything else. Also, Baxendale was then still working at long range from Dundee, Scotland (DC Thomson Ltd, Baxendale's former employers, were based in Dundee).

Accordingly, it was Alf Wallace and Albert Cosser (soon to be known to their young audience as Alf and Cos) who determined the initial format of Smash! They also recruited the artists who would draw the early issues, as it was plain that Baxendale was fully occupied with the art for Wham! Hence Baxendale's initial contribution to Smash! was limited to providing a list of titles and situations for the humour strips, together with brief written scenarios (script ideas for the individual weekly issues), which he gave to Wallace to be farmed-out to other artists. The Swots and The Blots was one of these. Ironically, Baxendale's strips would eventually become a major contribution to Smash!, after March 1969, but only because the closure of Wham! freed him to work on Smash! instead.

Initially, Baxendale was asked only to create the Bad Penny strip, and to give Grimly Feendish (a character from his Eagle Eye, Junior Spy strip then running in Wham!) a strip of his own. Wallace also had Baxendale draw the covers for the first three issues, #1 featuring Ronnie Rich and #2-3 starring the Swots and the Blots.

Smash! launched with the same format as the early issues of Wham!, namely 24 pages per issue, four of which were in colour, but it was printed on lower-quality paper than Wham!.

Launch and initial lineup

The initial lineup of strips mixed humour and adventure freely, with the comedic Ronnie Rich featured on the cover of the first issue.

Humour strips
There were typically a dozen British humour strips in each of Smash!'s first 162 issues. The initial lineup of humour strips included three originally by Leo Baxendale — The Man From B.U.N.G.L.E., Bad Penny, and Grimly Feendish — as well Percy's Pets by Mac (Stanley McMurtry); The Nervs by Graham Allen; Ronnie Rich by Gordon Hogg; Queen of the Seas by Ken Reid; Space Jinx by Brian Lewis; The Tellybugs by Walter Thorburn and George Parlett, with later contributions by Cyril Price; and The Swots and the Blots, initially by Mike Lacey.

The Man From B.U.N.G.L.E. was a spoof of the popular TV series The Man from U.N.C.L.E., and like Grimly Feendish was a spin-off from Baxendale's Eagle-Eye, Junior Spy strip in Wham!). The strip was featured on the cover of Smash! fourteen times in the first 18 issues. Bad Penny had some similarities with Baxendale's earlier Minnie the Minx character in The Beano. When Baxendale had been drawing Minnie the Minx, he had concentrated on experimenting with facial expressions and character traits. By the time he began working on Bad Penny his drawing style had matured, with an equal concentration on developing a zany but tight storyline, less emphasis on close-ups of facial expressions, but retaining the essentials needed to put over a character's own personality traits. The strip was popular enough that it survived the changes of 1969, and continued to appear in the new Smash!. When the strip was eventually dropped, Bad Penny herself still continued to appear, making occasional appearances in Baxendale's The Swots and the Blots as a new member of the Blots.

As had happened in Wham!, artists such as Mike Lacey were commissioned from time to time to "ghost" Baxendale's style. The Swots and the Blots was one of these. The strip's origins lay in Baxendale's classroom-based strip The Tiddlers, which had then been running for two years in Wham! (and which continued in Pow! when it merged with Wham in 1968, where it was combined with Ron Spencer's The Dolls of St Dominics to become The Tiddlers and The Dolls). In fact The Swots and the Blots was a direct continuation of  The Tiddlers, with only a change of title. The characters (i.e. "Teach" and the Blots), the school buildings, and the situations, all were largely as they had been in The Tiddlers. The only difference was the addition of the Swots, so that Teach now had an ally. The Swots and the Blots reached a new standard of excellence when Baxendale began drawing it for the new-look Smash! from March 1969, but even during the Odhams years, it had wit and a sense of style. In Baxendale's hands, it had notable similarities to his earlier classroom-based strip, The Bash Street Kids, in The Beano.

Subtitled The Rottenest Crook in the World, Grimly Feendish featured the most popular character from Wham!'s Eagle-Eye, Junior Spy. Feendish's ghoulish appearance was based on Uncle Fester from the American television series The Addams Family (and, presumably, on Charles Addams's illustrations from which the TV series was derived). At one point, the strip occupied a prestigious position as the full-colour back cover feature each week, and it survived throughout the entire run of 162 issues published by Odhams (even though, after giving up its back-cover status, it was sometimes ignominiously reduced to only a quarter-page "filler").

Mac's Percy's Pets was often a half-page feature; it proved popular enough that it made sporadic reappearances in the new Smash! after March 1969.

The Nervs was the most bizarre of the Odhams humour strips, depicting a group of little characters inhabiting a schoolboy called Fatty: the strip shows them running Fatty like a group of workers running a factory. Allocated two pages, it followed the same formula as Baxendale's strip Georgie's Germs from Wham!. The Nervs was drawn by Ken Reid in its final months during 1968–69. Under Reid's direction, The Nervs turned into an extremely surreal, even visceral, strip; achieving a rare level of hilarity and bawdiness, in a subversive presentation of comical horror – and in the process alarming IPC's management.

Reid's The Queen of the Seas was a masterpiece of comic artistry. Many readers failed to understand (amongst many things in the strip that went over their heads) that the two main characters were drawn in the likeness of comedians Stan Laurel and Oliver Hardy, and that the strip's humour was based on their movies. Perhaps too intelligent for its target audience – its disappearance was a great loss to the comic.

Lewis' Space Jinx was the first and only character to hold the coveted colour centre pages of Smash!. It is unclear why Alf and Cos chose this deeply unfunny strip for what must have been considered the pride of place in the new comic. Space Jinx was primarily another Jonah (a strip by Ken Reid which had run in The Beano), except that it could not hold its own against the brilliance of Reid's sea-faring twit. Space Jinx was replaced in issue #16 (21 May 1966) by The Incredible Hulk reprints; Lewis soon returned with Charlie's Choice, about a boy with a magic television set who can bring the characters in the programmes out from the TV screen into his world. It was a device for featuring, as guest stars in the strip each week, an assortment of popular TV stars. The strip's debut, for instance, featured Robert Vaughn and David McCallum of the top-rated secret agent show The Man From U.N.C.L.E., maximising their appearance by splashing them across the front cover. The strip sought to capitalise on the enormous popularity of television — a popularity which was seriously harming comics sales. The hope was that by bringing popular television stars into Smash!'s pages, this would make TV's growing popularity work for the comic – a not very subtle ploy to boost its circulation and sales.

Another early strip based on the spy craze of the Sixties, though not featured in Smash #1, was the humour strip Danger Mouse, about a mouse secret agent, which debuted in issue #3 and ran until the summer of 1967.

Adventure strips
Adventure strips that debuted in issue #1 were The Ghost Patrol by Gerry Embleton, Brian's Brain by Bert Vandeput,  and The Legend Testers by Keith Chapman and Jordi Bernet; all of them had science fiction overtones. The Ghost Patrol, a war strip, was actually a reprint of a strip originally called Phantom Patrol that ran in Odham's Swift in 1962.<ref>"Phantom Patrol", International Catalogue of Superheroes. Retrieved Feb. 10, 2021.</ref> The Ghost Patrol lasted until issue #26; it was symptomatic of the British adventure strips that plagued Smash! during the Odhams years, which tended to be "sloppy in presentation and possessed of little real character or emotion". Brian's Brain was canceled after issue #15 (14 May 1966), but then was revived in issue #93 (11 November 1967), lasting until the March 1969 relaunch. Long after being cancelled in 1967, the time traveller feature The Legend Testers was continued in the 1970 Smash! Annual.

For most of the Odhams years, Smash! was essentially a humour and superhero comic, with few traditional adventure strips. Notable adventure series in the first hundred issues include Moon Madness by Alf Wallace and Brian Lewis, The Legend Testers by Keith Chapman and Jordi Bernet, and The Rubber Man by Ken Mennell and Alfredo Marculeta.The Python, written by Alf Wallace, was a Pow! feature, debuting in Pow! #1 (21 Jan. 1967). Experiment X by Ed Feito was also a Pow! (science fiction) feature, debuting in Pow! #44 (18 Nov. 1967).

 June 1966 overhaul: bring on the superheroes 
 Superhero strips 
 The Incredible Hulk 
After only five months – foreshadowing many, many reshuffles to come – Smash! underwent its first major overhaul: black-and-white reprints of Marvel Comics strips, all written by Stan Lee, were introduced into Smash! with issue #16 (dated 21 May 1966) when the Incredible Hulk began (drawn by Jack Kirby). As was standard practice with UK reprints of American comics, due to the larger UK page size, pages from the original American comics were rearranged (and sometimes panels dropped altogether) to fit.

It's hard to overstate the significance of the introduction of The Hulk. It was the first Marvel Comics strip featured by Odhams, the success of which led to the introduction of the Fantastic Four into Wham! on 6 August of that year, and to the launching of two entire comics entirely dedicated to Marvel superheroes – Fantastic and Terrific – in 1967. The Hulk's initial appearance in Smash! took up a massive six pages, one-quarter of each 24-page issue, pushing fully five existing strips out of that issue, and causing the cancellation of Space Jinx and Brian's Brain (although the latter would be revived much later).

One early issue of Smash! even printed an original Hulk story, hastily produced as a filler when there was a problem with the originally intended reprint material. Titled "The Monster and the Matador", it was published in Smash! #38 (22 October 1966)."Marvel U.K.", An International Catalogue of Superheroes. Retrieved Jan. 19, 2021.

When Smash! caught up to the final issue of Incredible Hulk that Marvel had published in America, Odhams turned to the Hulk's "guest star" appearances in Fantastic Four and The Avengers (these stories too were drawn by Jack Kirby), and these other Marvel heroes proved equally popular.

 Batman 
With issue #20, DC's Batman became the second American superhero to debut in Smash!, crashing onto the front cover a month after the Hulk's debut, in re-edited reprints from American daily and Sunday newspaper strips (these were credited in-page to Batman creator Bob Kane, but were actually drawn by Al Plastino and ghost-written by Whitney Ellsworth). This was a response to the sudden and enormous popularity of the Batman television series starring Adam West. Batman with Robin the Boy Wonder took over the front cover (eventually holding that spot for better than a year and a half, 94 covers), whilst Grimly Feendish lost the colour back cover to Reid's Queen of the Seas, which shrank from its original two pages each week to only a single page. The loss of the extra page was a setback, but was compensated for by the strip now having a more prestigious location in the comic, and of course by now being in colour. The expansion of the American content, with the arrival of Batman, meant the loss of two more of the initial British strips: the reprint strip The Ghost Patrol, and the humour strip The Tellybugs.

Initially, this syndicated newspaper strip adopted the camp style of the television series, with appearances by humorous guest stars such as American funnyman Jack Benny. In the later part of the run (which featured serious, rather than camp, stories) Batgirl, too, appeared in the strip, a response to her addition to the TV show in its third season: in the newspaper strip, Batman initially believed her to be a criminal rather than a crime fighter. Superman then co-starred in the strip, which was retitled Superman and Batman with Robin the Boy Wonder, as Batman and Robin attempt to save Superman from the diabolical Professor Zinkk, who was secretly poisoning him with kryptonite.

When, after two years, the popularity of the Batman television series eventually faded, from issue #114 onward Batman and Robin were moved to the inside pages, yielding the front cover to the long-running success The Swots and the Blots.

 Other Marvel heroes 
In July 1967 (issue #76) Daredevil (drawn at various times by Bill Everett, Wally Wood, and Gene Colan) joined the Hulk in Smash!, replacing it altogether with issue #82, Smash! having exhausted all Hulk stories, from all sources, which had been published in the USA up to that time.

In September 1968 the Fantastic Four began a six-month run in Smash!, when it absorbed Pow! (which had previously merged with Wham!, in which the strip had initially featured). As one of only a handful of Pow! strips to survive the merger, the Fantastic Four was used to lure Pow! readers to the new comic. The strip was introduced to readers of Smash! with the wedding of Reed and Sue from Fantastic Four Annual #3. Their adventures continued with "Defeated by the Frightful Four" (Fantastic Four #38 [May 1965], and ran through to "Lo, There Shall Be an Ending!" (Fantastic Four #43  [Oct. 1965]), which was the final Marvel story to appear in Smash! (published in issue #162, 8 March 1969).Spider-Man reprints, by Stan Lee and Steve Ditko, which had been a mainstay of Pow!, also joined the new Smash! and Pow! in the same issue as the FF's debut (#137); these, however, lasted only through issue #144 (2 Nov. 1968).Thor began a short run in November 1968 when Smash! absorbed Fantastic. The stories, continued from Fantastic, began with Thor battling the Growing Man (from Thor #140, May 1967); when the Marvel reprint strips were discontinued the following spring, the final Thor story had a new ending substituted, in a rushed attempt to resolve a continuing sub-plot.

The financial crisis which overtook Odhams in 1968, resulting in the closure of all the other Power Comics, also caused them to give up the expensive licence to reprint the Marvel superhero stories. This decision took effect in March 1969, when the licence came up for renewal; the final Marvel strips appeared in issue #162. The expensive Batman newspaper strip had already been discontinued, ending in issue #157.

 Baxendale's departure for Fleetway 
Leo Baxendale, whose strips dominated so much of Smash! in its early years, left Odhams in 1968, moving to Fleetway Publications, another IPC subsidiary. All the same, he still contributed strips to Smash! — just not under his own name. For instance, for strips like Bad Penny and Grimly Feendish, Baxendale penciled the drawings, and Mike Brown, an animator by trade, inked them in. In this way, they together turned out large numbers of the strips, which they sold to Odhams under Brown's name — a situation Baxendale referred to, in his 1978 autobiography, as working "undercover":

 Collapse of the Power Comics line 

 September 1968: Pow! merger 

Whereas 1968 began with all five Power Comics titles apparently flourishing, by the year's end only Smash! was still being published. The increasingly frantic series of mergers — first when the already-merged Pow! and Wham! was absorbed by Smash! with issue #137 (14 September 1968) and then when the already-merged Fantastic and Terrific was absorbed by Smash! and Pow! with issue #144 (2 November 1968) — resulted in ever more ludicrous titles, culminating in the astonishing Smash and Pow Incorporating Fantastic (commonly spoofed as Smash, Pow, Wham, incorporating Fantastic and Terrific).

One of the major causes of the collapse was the repeated decline in 1968 of the value of the pound sterling against the U.S. dollar; this significantly increased the cost of publishing the American strips (which had to be paid for in dollars), and raised the daunting specter of further increases if the pound fell in value yet again. Increasing the cover price of the Power Comics titles to compensate was impossible because of stiff competition (with sales on a sharp downward spiral, as circulation fell victim to the ever-increasing popularity of television); so the fall in the value of sterling made the American strips unaffordable.

Some of Smash!'s best-remembered strips were acquired in the merger with Pow! — which had already absorbed the most popular strips from its previous merger with Wham!. The most notable of these strips were The Cloak by Mike Higgs, and Wiz War by Mike Brown. The Cloak, a secret agent humour strip, benefited from the unusual, idiosyncratic drawing style of Higgs, whose overt inclusion of pop culture imagery made the strip seem extremely modern. Brown's Wiz War evoked Mad magazine's Spy vs. Spy in its portrayal of an ongoing feud between two wizards. Brown seems to have been unaware of the house rule banning artists from signing their work, as the strip often bore his name. Wiz War became one of a handful of strips to survive the changes of 1969.

The canceled strips in the merger with Pow! were the Smash! strips Charlie's Choice, Ronnie Rich and The Man From B.U.N.G.L.E.. Also lost in this merger, in effect, was Pow!'s Dare-A-Day Davy strip by Ken Reid, one of several established features which were dropped instead of transferring to Smash!.

 November 1968: Merger with Fantastic and Terrific 
Although desiring to discontinue the expensive American superhero reprints, Odhams were unable to immediately terminate their contracts with the American publishers, DC and Marvel. This could only be done gradually, when each contract came up for renewal. Thus, as each Power Comics title closed, its superhero strips were usually discontinued.

A tipping point was reached in issue #144, when the merged Smash! and Pow! - as it now was - lost its Daredevil and Spider-Man strips, which together had comprised a full third of each 24-page issue, but had to accommodate both Thor and Fantastic Four from discontinued titles — plus a slew of new British adventure strips, which were being added in preparation for the comic's impending transition to solely-British content and the new 40-page format.

To plug the gap left by the loss of the American strips, four adventure serials were introduced in issue #144: At Night Stalks... The Spectre, Destination Danger, Laird of the Apes, and King of the Ring. All four strips featured cliff-hanger endings each week. Fantastic Four and Thor, the last survivors of all the mergers, lasted in Smash! until the final Marvel contract expired in March 1969; the Batman strip also continued, until January 1969.

All this could not be achieved within the standard Smash! format of 24 pages. IPC "bit the bullet" and, in a single bound, with issue #144 increased the page count from 24 to 36 pages (a fifty percent increase), with a consequent sharp rise in production costs, and so a marked decline in profit-per-copy. IPC's intention was to reproduce with Smash! the successful formula which was buoying-up sales of their most popular titles, Lion and Valiant, both of which were 36-pagers: in effect, to produce a clone of them: an identical mix of adventure and humour, with an identical page count, at an identical price.

As sole survivor of the Power Comics line, Smash! couldn't hope to generate enough income on its own to meet the actual losses incurred due to the line's sudden contraction. In fact, it didn't need to. Because the Power Comics line was published by Odhams Press Ltd — a subsidiary company with limited liability — it was possible to ring-fence all debts on the Odhams publications within that one company, thus preventing any losses affecting the rest of the IPC Group (since IPC's other titles were all published by other IPC subsidiaries). Accordingly, with effect from 1 January 1969 Smash! was transferred to IPC Magazines Ltd, a new IPC subsidiary formed during 1968, leaving Odhams with no continuing titles; Smash! started again from scratch.

 IPC takes over 

In January 1969 Odhams ceased to exist as a publishing imprint, and Smash! now became an IPC Magazines publication. Despite being the longest survivor, and inheriting many popular strips from the other four Power Comics titles, Smash! was only a limited success.

Most of the consequences of the change in publisher didn't become apparent until the issue cover-dated 15 March, in which the comic changed dramatically, dropping the last remaining Marvel superhero strips, to shed the expense of the licensing fee for using them (having already dropped Batman), and ending many other strips too. Two new adventure strips joined the lineup, however: Sergeant Rock — Paratrooper and Bunsen's Burner. They were really a part of the coming relaunch, but were introduced slightly ahead of time to disguise that fact.

Within the British market, boys' comics for the age group which was too old for titles such as The Beano, The Dandy and Sparky tended to focus around adventure, sport and war (in titles such as Lion and Valiant), or humour (in titles such as Buster). In abandoning its superheroes, Smash! sought to attract readers of both types, by offering traditional adventure as well as humour.

Introduced with issue #156 (25 Jan. 1969), the reprint strip Sergeant Rock — Paratrooper featured World War II stories of the "Red Devils" of the Parachute Regiment. Initially, Sgt. Rock is merely a narrator, introducing stories featuring other characters, so that the strip is actually tales-of-the-parachute-regiment rather than tales of Rock himself. This was a device for reprinting old war stories from other comics. The reprints in Smash! were reasonably successful, running for a year; and Rock eventually featured as more than just narrator, with later editions sending him into action with the SAS, and marking the change by altering the title to Sergeant Rock — Special Air Service. This change was noticeable also by a change of artist; seemingly – from the similarity of style – to the artist on the discontinued humour wartime strip Nutt and Bolt the Men from W.H.E.E.Z.E..Bunsen's Burner was introduced in issue #158 (8 Feb. 1969). It was an adventure yarn with humorous overtones (hinted at in its title, a reference to an item familiar to most schoolboys from chemistry class). Ben Bunsen is the owner of a vintage car known as "the Burner" because it is so old it is steam-driven. Like an old-fashioned steam train, it has a boiler which has to be stoked, as it runs on coal instead of petrol. Ben and his pal have to drive the Burner around the world, as a condition of Ben inheriting his uncle's fortune, but a rival claimant (shades of the later Smash! strip His Sporting Lordship) is secretly out to stop them. Bunsen's Burner was discontinued during the reshuffles of August 1969, when various changes were quietly made to the title over the course of a month.

 March 1969 relaunch 

IPC had waited three months to relaunch Smash!, because, on the one hand, it needed some lead-time in which to ready new strips, and, on the other, in the publishing industry spring was traditionally considered a good time to launch a new comic. With the first relaunch issue (#163, dated 15 March 1969), Smash! then introduced a new cover feature, new strips, and free gifts. In all but name, it was a new comic.

The symbol of the change was the new cover feature, Warriors of the World (replacing The Swots and Blots, which, drawn by Mike Lacey, had occupied the cover during the final part of the Odhams years (50 covers in all); The Swots and the Blots survived — and prospered — on the inside pages, now drawn by Leo Baxendale). The Warriors of the World cover feature was an illustration of a historical army or militia with a short text description. The relaunch issue's cover feature was entitled Warriors of the World No.1, and Smash!'s former numbering was discontinued. To have maintained the original sequential numbering alongside the Warriors of the World series could only have caused confusion.

With the relaunch, Smash! firmly placed itself within the world of British boys' comics (whereas it had previously appealed to both genders), proclaiming itself "Britain's Biggest Boys' Paper". Within the UK market, boys' comics for the age group which was too old for titles such as The Beano, The Dandy, and Sparky tended to focus around adventure, sport, and war — in titles such as Lion and Valiant — or humour — in titles such as Buster. The revamped Smash!, now comprising 40 pages, sought to attract readers of both types, by offering adventure serials, humour strips, and sporting strips – but strictly no American superheroes. Smash! thereby became the last ever British comic to feature a varied mix of adventure, humour, and sports-themed stories. Subsequent boys' comics featured exclusively sports, or war, or humour; such as Scorcher and Score and Shoot (which featured only soccer), and Action and Battle (which featured only war stories).

One other aspect of the change: under the umbrella of IPC Magazines Ltd, the editorial team of Alf and Cos was replaced by a single editor, identified only as "Mike". A hallmark of the new editorial policy of mixing serious and humorous strips was the even-handedness with which the editorial staff drew the multitude of reprint strips featured in the new Smash!: there were strips from both Lion — such as Eric the Viking (originally Karl the Viking) and The Battle of Britain (originally Britain in Chains) — and from Buster — such as Wacker (originally Elmer). The number of reprint strips, which were significantly cheaper than commissioning new strips, was another significant indicator of the title's troubled financial situation.

Of the former Odhams strips, only a handful survived. Humour strips that continued were The Swots and the Blots, Wiz War and Bad Penny. Additionally, Percy's Pets made occasional appearances (but did not appear every week). Much mourned were the loss of The Cloak and The Man from B.U.N.G.L.E., dropped due to the waning popularity of spy spoofs (in 1968 even the TV series The Man from U.N.C.L.E. had been canceled). And especially mourned was the loss of Ken Reid and The Nervs. The serious offerings fared even worse. The only genuine survivor from the adventure strips of the Odhams years was King of the Ring, and even that had only begun with issue #144, in November 1968.

In light of how few strips of any sort survived from the Odhams era, and given that none of the superhero strips survived at all (which, according to the letters pages were the most popular feature of the Power Comics line), it would be stretching the truth to say that Smash! inherited the best of the Odhams strips. Stylistically, The Swots and the Blots was the most creative and sophisticated Odhams strip (save only The Nervs), and it did survive. However, it was only one strip. And The Nervs, which was objectively a more sophisticated strip in 1968, did not.

Moreover, the publisher was taking a significant risk by re-launching the former Power Comic as, in effect, a clone of IPC's most popular titles, Lion and Valiant. The publisher hoped it could repeat the success of those titles by copying their successful formula. Nevertheless, without its discontinued superheroes Smash! had nothing unique about it that might attract new readers, featuring as it did a mix of strips reprinted from (or based on the style of) Lion and Buster.

Humour strips
As under Odhams, humour continued to play a large part in the relaunched comic (in terms of the page count), not to the extent it did in Buster, but at least as much as in Valiant or Lion. Yet it was not only in the plainly cartoon-style strips that humour flourished in the new Smash!. Many of the ostensibly more serious offerings were, in reality, humour strips: in particular, His Sporting Lordship and The World Wide Wanderers, but there was also a strong humorous undercurrent in the new lead serial, Master of the Marsh.

Leo Baxendale's The Swots and the Blots was one of the handful of surviving Odhams strips, which after the relaunch moved from the prestigious front cover to the centre pages. Nevertheless, now drawn by Baxendale, it became a standard-bearer for sophisticated artwork. Baxendale began a five-year run on the strip (beginning in Smash! and continuing in its successor, Valiant and Smash, with some fill-ins by Les Barton), by adopting a new style, one which influenced many others in the comics field, just as his earlier The Beano work had done; and in the process attaining a new, deliriously daft, high standard, one rarely approached by other strips.

Sporting strips
Sporting strips were now the order of the day, most notably Master of the Marsh by Tom Tully and Francisco Solano Lopez, His Sporting Lordship by Douglas Maxted, the football strip The World-Wide Wanderers, and King of the Ring, the only surviving sports strip from the Odhams, which continued to prosper. Possibly feeling the strip was suffering in the credibility stakes, the new editorial team made a decision to change the name of King's manager, the aforementioned Blarney Stone. They threw Blarney out of the series and substituted a new manager with a less silly name: "Ballyhoo Barnes". Even so, Blarney reappeared after a few weeks, back by popular demand.His Sporting Lordship proved to be the most successful (certainly the most long-running) of the new sports-based strips; it ultimately became one of the few to outlast Smash! itself, continuing on into Valiant and Smash and then Valiant and TV21.

Adventure strips
The other staple of the new Smash! was adventure serials, and far and away the most successful of these was The Incredible Adventures of Janus Stark, written by Tom Tully and illustrated by Francisco Solano López. This brings up the matter of economics once more. Solano Lopez was a foreign illustrator, born in Argentina, who worked at a studio in Spain. For reasons of cost, IPC had taken a policy decision to source artwork from cheaper sources outside the UK. Along with the presence in the new Smash! of reprint strips, which were much cheaper than commissioning new strips, this is yet another indicator of the financial pressure the comic was still under, and the absolute necessity of cutting production costs to the bone in order to make it financially viable. The strip was about an escapologist in Victorian London with an unusually flexible bone structure, which enabled him to get out of an astonishing variety of tight situations. There was more than a touch of Reed Richards (from the departed Fantastic Four strip) in Stark's uncanny abilities. Stark's flexible bone structure, which was the basis of his career as an escapologist in the theatres, was perhaps more akin to Rubberman, a character who had featured in Smash! in 1966. Lopez's dark, moody artwork also gave the strip a perfect 19th century setting.

As a mark of Janus Stark's popularity, from week 30 it replaced Master of the Marsh as the lead serial on page 3 (swapping places with the latter, which was thus relegated to an inconspicuous location on pages 12 and 13). The strip was one of the few to survive the merger of Smash! into Valiant in 1971, and is still well-remembered today.

Other adventures strips added in the March 1969 relaunch were Rebbels on the Run, Cursitor Doom, and the reprint strips Eric the Viking and The Battle of Britain (which, in spite of the title, had no connection with the Second World War).

 August 1969 changes 

After 22 weeks, in August 1969, a new round of changes occurred. Six months earlier, various humour strips had been introduced as replacements for the (far more surreal) humour of Ken Reid, whose strip The Nervs had so disturbed IPC's management. Another change was now forthcoming, one which reflected the pervasive sporting theme of the relaunched Smash!: two new soccer strips began — the humour strip The Touchline Tearaways, and a serious strip entitled The Handcuff Hotspurs (replacing the departed – and rather more humorous – World Wide Wanderers).

In addition, Nutt and Bolt the Men from W.H.E.E.Z.E. was dropped, and replaced from the 23rd issue by a more serious World War II strip, Send For... Q-Squad. This, too, in keeping with the need to cut costs, was a reprint, marked out as such by its unique style – which was both different from, and grimmer than, all the other strips. Whereas Sgt Rock emulated Lord Henry (and Janus Stark), by maintaining a huge and confident smile, regardless of how much trouble he was in, no one in Q-Squad ever stopped looking worried.

These three new strips represented a minor change of emphasis, replacing two of the more whimsical offerings with two entirely serious strips; the third new entry (which was only a single-page) was simply one outright cartoon strip replacing another.

Furthermore, the editorial column admitted receiving complaints from readers about the loss of the Marvel superhero strips. So, six months after Fantastic Four and Thor had been dropped, an all-British superhero called Tri-Man appeared, debuting in the issue dated 13 September; the character also featured in the Smash! Annual that Christmas. Some indication of the effort put into this character is the fact that he was given sole possession of the front cover of the Annual. The strip did not prove popular, however, and quietly vanished in the reshuffles of 1970.

Thus, within six months, a number of the strips introduced in the relaunch had already bitten the dust.

The most obvious problem faced by the new-look Smash! was the constant "churn": the incessant turnover of strips. Without its solidly popular superhero strips to rely on, the editorial staff seemed pathologically incapable of settling on a fixed line-up.

1970 relaunch

 January/February 1970 changes Smash! endured yet another major shakeup in the first two months of 1970, when further changes of editorial policy were imposed by new owners Reed International, which had bought out IPC that year. In the aftermath of the changes made in August 1969, further changes made at the start of 1970 left Smash! looking very different from its appearance in the wake of the relaunch just 12 months earlier. A vast number of new strips were added, in what amounted to a second relaunch, such that only half of those introduced in March 1969 now survived, although those which continued included Master of the Marsh, Janus Stark, His Sporting Lordship, Battle of Britain, Eric the Viking, Wacker, The Handcuff Hotspurs, The Swots and the Blots, and Percy's Pets – the latter two now being the only remaining Odhams strips. Discontinued were King of the Ring (last survivor of the serious strips from the Odhams era), Sergeant Rock – Special Air Service, and Cursitor Doom. Three of the strips only recently introduced were also dropped, namely the wartime Q-Squad, British superhero Tri-Man, and the humour strip The Touchline Tearaways.

The first changes in 1970 occurred in the issue dated 24 January, when three new strips appeared, all reprints from Buster: The Kid Commandos, Consternation Street, and Monty Muddle – The Man from Mars (originally titled Milkiway – The Man from Mars). As had been done in the spring of 1969, by bringing in some of the changes a few weeks ahead of the relaunch, the publisher hoped to disguise the true extent of the changes.

The 7th February issue then saw a full relaunch: with more free gifts, another new cover feature — The Thirteen Tasks of Simon Test — and no less than eight new strips, making an astonishing eleven strips added since the beginning of the year. New supporting strips introduced in the 7th February issue included Threat of the Toymaker, The Pillater Peril, Birdman of Baratoga, Nick and Nat – The Beat Boys, and three humour strips with a common supernatural element: Sam's Spook (drawn by Leo Baxendale), The Haunts of Headless Harry, and Ghost Ship.

The 1970 relaunch also resulted in the dropping of the Warriors of the World cover feature. The Warriors of the World covers had run into a problem, in that war stories were no longer a strong element of Smash!, which had dropped the humour strip Nutt and Bolt the Men from W.H.E.E.Z.E. some time earlier. When it was decided to also drop Sergeant Rock – Paratrooper (by then renamed Sergeant Rock – Special Air Service), and Q-Squad, the cover feature had to go too. It was not practical to advertise war stories on the cover if there were no war stories inside. The newly added Kid Commandos did not count as a war story in this context, since the three fugitive children did not do any conventional fighting. The strip was more like a souped-up version of the discontinued Rebbels on the Run.

Accordingly, after forty-seven weeks the Warriors of the World series was ended. Instead, the issue dated 7 February 1970 began The Thirteen Tasks of Simon Test, written by Angus Allan and drawn by the ever-popular Eric Bradbury. Henceforth until the merger with Valiant, each week's cover featured a full-page splash advertising the task which adventurer Simon Test would undertake in a new strip on the inside pages. This strip proved so successful that when the original thirteen-week series was completed (featuring one task each week), Simon Test was given a new series of adventures, extending his hold on the cover indefinitely (he had 47 covers in all). The Simon Test feature would prove particularly enduring, being one of the few strips to ultimately survive the merger with Valiant in 1971.

 Summer 1970 changes 
Further changes followed: fully thirteen strips had been introduced since the start of 1970. In the issue dated 27 June, a new humour strip began, Moonie's Magic Mate. In the issue dated 29 August, a humour strip titled The Fighting Three began (another reprint from Buster, where, under its original title Mighty McGinty, the strip had run in 1964). Finally, in the last addition before the comic's closure, Tyler the Tamer was launched in early 1971. A common supernatural theme linked the three new humour strips. Dropped to make room for these were Kid Commandos, Threat of the Toymaker and The Pillater Peril (the Pillater saga seemingly reaching a natural conclusion, instead of merely being summarily abandoned).

Merger with Valiant
In mid-November 1970, production on Smash! (and many other IPC titles, including Valiant) came to a halt due to a printers' strike, and no editions were published for the next three months. By the time the strike was settled, in February of the following year, irreparable damage had been done to the comic's circulation, as its young readers had turned elsewhere in the intervening 11 weeks. Similar harm had been suffered by Valiant. In consequence of this latest financial disaster, after eight issues, in April 1971 the two titles were merged in an attempt to combine their surviving circulation. For a brief time the merged comic was entitled Valiant and Smash (10 April to 18 September 1971), before reverting to simply Valiant.

Some strips from Smash! survived in the new comic, including His Sporting Lordship, Janus Stark and The Swots and the Blots, but most were lost, although the Smash! Annual continued to appear for many years afterward (continuing, in fact, until the 1976 Annual, published in the autumn of 1975). A lot of the strips thereby continued to appear each year, including many which had not even survived into Valiant, long after Smash! had ceased publication as a comic.

The sports-themed His Sporting Lordship had enjoyed perhaps the greatest popularity, surviving the shake-ups of 1969 and 1970, and then surviving even the merger with Valiant, though it was to last only a few months in its new home, finally ending in December 1971. However, it was revived in the 1972 Smash! Annual, published at Christmas 1971, and returned year after year, becoming the regular cover feature of the Annuals.

The merged title was dominated by Valiant, which contributed nine strips consisting of twenty pages; whereas Smash! was represented by only four strips, totaling a meager nine pages: Janus Stark, The Swots & The Blots, Simon Test, and His Sporting Lordship.

Despite all of the changes, the new Smash! had lasted only two years. It was only marginally profitable, but no title could have survived such a lengthy loss of production. Its demise was directly attributable to the strike.Smash! was the last attempt in the UK market to publish a general boys comic, mixing adventure, sports and humour strips. Subsequent comics would survive only by ruthlessly focusing on narrow, sectional interests: such as all-sports, all-war, or all-humour; just as the American market had already specialised into all-funnies, all-horror, and all-superhero titles. The writing was on the wall for non-niche comics in the UK, for, in the face of the competition from television, even IPC's flagship, Valiant, ultimately could not survive.

 Smash! characters in Albion 
Many of IPC's characters, including several from Smash!, were featured in the 2005–2006 limited series Albion, published by WildStorm (DC Comics). Those from Smash! included Bad Penny, Brian's Brain, The Cloak, Cursitor Doom, Grimly Feendish, Janus Stark, Rubberman, Tri-Man, and the cast of Queen of the Seas.

 Analysis 
Part of the problem with Smash! was that it went through far too many changes in its early days, particularly in its adventure strips. The Ghost Patrol came and went; The Legend Testers came and went; Brian Lewis' Moon Madness was particularly short-lived; and there were numerous others, equally forgettable. None proved popular enough to last. Undeniably, none enjoyed the tremendous popularity of the American superhero strips which the comic would shortly feature, which genuinely had sufficient popularity to rival that of television.

Those readers old enough to have become emotionally attached to comics before Odhams introduced American superhero strips to British readers tended to dislike those superhero strips. Whereas, according to the letters pages each week, those same Marvel and DC heroes were enormously popular among the younger age group who had not been reading comics previously. Accordingly, Wham! readers tended to resent the changes made in 1966, because British strips were canceled in Wham! and replaced with U.S. superheroes, whereas Smash! readers did not resent the superheroes, because in 1966 that comic had only just launched, so there were no real changes – Smash! more or less teemed with American strips from the very beginning.

The decision in 1969 to discontinue the American superhero strips was the real cause of the comic's demise. Other problems would contribute to the difficulties it subsequently faced – including strikes at the company's printers – but the root cause of those problems was the falling circulation it suffered, which was a consequence of not having any unique elements to distinguish it from other IPC comics such as Lion and Valiant. The key to understanding the situation is that the superheroes were the only element that genuinely had the necessary popularity to halt the decline in weekly sales caused by the competition from television.

 Smash! cover features 

 List of Smash! original comic strips 

 List of Smash! reprint comic strips 

 Comic strips timeline 

 Notes 

References
 Citations 

 Sources consulted 
 Coates, Alan and David. "Smash!" British Comic World #3 (A. & D. Coates, June 1984).
 Holland, Steve. Fleetway Companion (Colne, Lancs., A. & B. Whitworth, Feb. 1992).
 

Further reading
 Baxendale, Leo: A Very Funny Business: 40 Years of Comics''. Gerald Duckworth & Co., London (1978). Autobiography.

External links
 Smash! at the British Comics website
 Smash! comic art
 Smash! cover art at the Grand Comics Database
 Smash! #150 cover art
 Valiant and Smash, Comics UK Gallery
 1960s British Comics review
 Stephen Poppitt's Blog-o-Sphere

1966 comics debuts
1971 comics endings
Comics magazines published in the United Kingdom
British humour comics
Weekly magazines published in the United Kingdom
Defunct British comics
Fleetway and IPC Comics titles
Magazines published in London
Magazines established in 1966
Magazines disestablished in 1971
Odhams Press titles